Annie Isabel Crawford (1856-1942) was an American painter and print maker.

Biography
Crawford was born in Buffalo, New York, on November 3, 1856. She studied at the Buffalo Fine Arts Academy and then traveled to Europe to study in Rome and Paris. While in Europe she met Charlotte "Emma" Wharton Kaan (1860-1949), who joined Crawford in Buffalo where the couple resided together and collaborated on artistic projects, including teaching. The couple also created a unique form of relief printing that combined woodcut prints and hand-coloring. They were associated with the Arts and Crafts movement.

Crawford exhibited work at the 20th Century Club, the Buffalo Fine Arts Academy (including the Albright Art Gallery), and the National Academy of Design.
She was a member of The Society of Arts and Crafts of Boston.

Crawford died on February 18, 1942, in Buffalo.

References

External links

Further reading
 Intimate Spirits: Remembering the Art and Lives of Annie Crawford & Emma Kaan, By Michael James and David F. Martin, Western New York Heritage magazine, October 15, 2007

1856 births
1942 deaths
American women painters
19th-century American women artists
20th-century American women artists
19th-century American painters
20th-century American painters
19th-century American printmakers
20th-century American printmakers
Artists from Buffalo, New York
Painters from New York (state)
American women printmakers